Pitcairnia flammea is a plant species in the genus Pitcairnia. This species is native to Brazil.

References

flammea
Endemic flora of Brazil
Flora of the Atlantic Forest